A regional election took place in Brittany on March 22, 1992, along with all other regions.

References

1992
1992 elections in France